Ragna Árnadóttir (born 30 August 1966) is an Icelandic lawyer and former Minister of Justice and Ecclesiastical Affairs of Iceland. She previously served as the acting office manager of the Prime Minister's Office from 15 January 2009.

Ragna started working for Landsvirkjun, Iceland's national power Company and its largest electricity generator, in 2010 and from 2012 to 2019, she served as the vice president of the company. She has been the Secretary General of Alþingi since 1 September 2019.

References 

1966 births
Living people
Ragna Arnadottir
Ragna Arnadottir
Ragna Arnadottir
Ragna Arnadottir
Ragna Arnadottir
Female interior ministers
21st-century Icelandic women politicians
21st-century Icelandic politicians
Female justice ministers